The term Greater Romania usually refers to the borders of the Kingdom of Romania in the interwar period, achieved after the Great Union. It also refers to a pan-nationalist idea.

As a concept, its main goal is the creation of a nation-state which would incorporate all Romanian speakers. In 1920, after the incorporation of Transylvania, Bukovina, Bessarabia and parts of Banat, Crișana, and Maramureș, the Romanian state reached its largest peacetime geographical extent ever (295,049 km²). Today, the concept serves as a guiding principle for the unification of Romania and Moldova.

The idea is comparable to other similar conceptions such as the Greater Bulgaria, Megali Idea, Greater Yugoslavia, Greater Hungary and Greater Italy.

Ideology
The theme of national identity had been always a key concern for Romanian culture and politics. The Romanian national ideology in the first decades of the twentieth century was a typical example of ethnocentric nationalism. The concept of "Greater Romania" shows similarities to the idea of national state. The Romanian territorial claims were based on "primordial racial modalities", the essential goal of them was to unify the biologically defined Romanians. The nation-building based on the French model of a unitary nation-state became an all time priority especially in the interwar and the Communist periods.

Evolution

Before World War I

The union of Michael the Brave, who ruled over the three principalities with Romanian population (Wallachia, Transylvania and Moldavia) for a short period of time, was viewed in later periods as the precursor of a modern Romania, a thesis which was argued with noted intensity by Nicolae Bălcescu. This theory became a point of reference for nationalists, as well as a catalyst for various Romanian forces to achieve a single Romanian state.

The Romanian revolution in 1848 already carried the seeds of the national dream of a unified and united Romania, though the "idea of unification" had been known from earlier works of Naum Ramniceanu (1802) and Ion Budai-Deleanu (1804). The concept owes its life to Dimitrie Brătianu, who introduced the term "Greater Romania" in 1852. The first step in unifying Romanians was to establish the United Principalities by uniting Moldavia and Wallachia in 1859, which became known as Romania since the 1866 Constitution and turned into a Kingdom in 1881, after gaining independence from the Ottoman Empire. However, before the Austro-Hungarian Compromise, the elite of the Transylvanian Romanians did not support the concept of "Greater Romania", instead they wanted only equality with the other nations in Transylvania. The concept became a political reality when, in 1881, the Romanian National Party of Transylvania gathered Romanians on a common political platform to fight together for Transylvania's autonomy. According to Livezeanu the creation of Greater Romania with "a unifying concept of nationhood" started to evolve in the late 1910s. World War I played a crucial part in the development of Romanian national consciousness.

World War I
The Treaty of Bucharest (1916) was signed between Romania and the Entente Powers on 4 (Old Style)/17 (New Style) August 1916 in Bucharest. The treaty stipulated the conditions under which Romania agreed to join the war on the side of the Entente, particularly territorial promises in Austria-Hungary. The signatories bound themselves to keep secret the contents of the treaty until a general peace was concluded.

{{Blockquote| 
Romanians!

The war which for the last two years has been encircling our frontiers more and more closely has shaken the ancient foundations of Europe to their depths.It has brought the day which has been awaited for centuries by the national conscience, by the founders of the Romanian State, by those who united the principalities in the war of independence, by those responsible for the national renaissance.It is the day of the union of all branches of our nation.  Today we are able to complete the task of our forefathers and to establish forever that which Michael the Great was only able to establish for a moment, namely, a Romanian union on both slopes of the Carpathians.For us the mountains and plains of Bukowina, where Stephen the Great has slept for centuries.  In our moral energy and our valour lie the means of giving him back his birthright of a great and free Rumania from the Tisza to the Black Sea, and to prosper in peace in accordance with our customs and our hopes and dreams.(...)

Part of the proclamation by King Ferdinand, 28 August 1916
}}

Lucian Boia summarised the territorial extent of the nationalist dream as following:The phrase "De la Nistru pana la Tisa" (From Dniester to Tisza) is well known to Romanians, it defines the limits of an ideal Romania, though we should note that the Romanian population extends in the east beyond the Dniester, while both banks of the Tisza are completely Hungarian for most of the river's length. To the south, the Danube completes the symbolic geography of Romania: an enclosed space between 3 rivers, with an area of 300.000 sq km, comparable to that of Italy or the British Isles. Rivers then are perceived as natural borders, separating Romanians from Others.Interwar Romania

The concept of "Greater Romania" materialized as a geopolitical reality after the First World War. Romania gained control over Bessarabia, Bukovina and Transylvania. The borders established by the treaties concluding the war did not change until 1940. Its constitution, proclaimed in 1923, "largely ignored the new ethnic and cultural realities".

The Romanian ideology changed due to the demographic, cultural and social alterations, however the nationalist desire for a homogeneous Romanian state conflicted with the multiethnic, multicultural truth of Greater Romania. The ideological rewriting of the role of "spiritual victimization", turning it into "spiritual police", was a radical and challenging task for the Romanian intellectuals because they had to entirely revise the national identity and the destiny of the Romanian nation. In accordance with this view, Livezeanu states that the Great Union created a "deeply fragmented" interwar Romania where the determination of national identity met with great difficulties mainly because of the effects of the hundred years of political separation. Due to the inability of the government to solve the problems of the Transylvanian Romanians' integration and the effects of the worldwide and national economic depression, "the population gradually lost its faith in the democratic conception of Greater Romania".

The Great Depression in Romania, which started in 1929, destabilised the country. The early 1930s were marked by social unrest, high unemployment, and strikes. In several instances, the Romanian government violently repressed strikes and riots, notably the 1929 miners' strike in Valea Jiului and the strike in the Grivița railroad workshops. In the mid-1930s, the Romanian economy recovered and the industry grew significantly, although about 80% of Romanians were still employed in agriculture. French economic and political influence was predominant in the early 1920s but then Germany became more dominant, especially in the 1930s.

 Territorial changes 

Bessarabia

Bessarabia declared its sovereignty as the Moldavian Democratic Republic in 1917 by the newly formed "Council of the Country" ("Sfatul Țării"). The state was faced with the disorderly retreat through its territory of Russian troops from disbanded units. In January 1918, the "Sfatul Țării" called on Romanian troops to protect the province from the Bolsheviks who were spreading the Russian Revolution.Charles Upson Clark, Bessarabia: Russia and Roumania on the Black Sea  After declaring independence from Russia on 24 January 1918, the "Sfatul Țării" voted for union with Romania on 9 April 1918.  Of the 138 deputies in the council, 86 voted for union, 3 against, 36 abstained (mostly the deputies representing minorities, 52% of the population at the time) and 13 were not present. The United Kingdom, France, Italy and Japan recognized the incorporation of Bessarabia through the Treaty of Paris. The United States and the Soviet Union however refused to do so, the latter maintaining a claim to the territory for the whole interwar period. Furthermore, Japan failed to ratify the treaty, which therefore never entered into force.

Bukovina

In Bukovina, after being occupied by the Romanian Army,Sherman David Spector, "Rumania at the Paris Peace Conference: A Study of the Diplomacy of Ioan I. C. Brătianu", Bookman Associates, 1962, p. 70 a National Council voted for union with Romania. While the Romanian, German, and Polish deputies unanimously voted for union, the Ukrainian deputies (representing 38% of the population according to the 1910 Austrian census) and Jewish deputies did not attend the council. The unification was ratified in the Treaty of Saint-Germain-en-Laye.

Transylvania

On 1 December 1918, the Great National Assembly of Alba Iulia proclaimed the union of Transylvania and other territories with Romania in Alba Iulia, adopted by the Deputies of the Romanians of Transylvania, and supported one month later by the vote of the Deputies of the Saxons of Transylvania. The Hungarians of Transylvania, about 32% at the time (including the Hungarian-speaking Jewish community), and the Germans of Banat did not elect deputies upon the dissolution of Austria-Hungary, since they were considered represented by the Budapest government of Hungary, nevertheless on 22 December 1918 the Hungarian General Assembly in Cluj (Kolozsvár) reaffirmed the loyalty of Hungarians from Transylvania to Hungary. In the 1920 Treaty of Trianon, Hungary was forced to give up all claims over Transylvania and the treaty set the new borders between the two countries.

World War II losses

In 1940, the Romanian state agreed to cede Bessarabia to the Soviet Union, as provided for by the Molotov-Ribbentrop Pact between the Soviet Union and Germany. It also lost Northern Bukovina and the Hertsa region, which were not mentioned in the pact, to the Soviet Union. It lost Northern Transylvania to Hungary, through the Second Vienna Award, and the Southern Dobruja to Bulgaria by the Treaty of Craiova. In the course of World War II, Romania, which was allied with the Axis Powers, not only re-annexed Bessarabia and Northern Bukovina, but also took under administrative control lands to the east of Dniester (parts of recently formed Moldavian SSR, and of Odessa and Vinnytsia oblasts of Ukrainian SSR), creating Transnistria Governorate. Despite clear Ukrainian majority in the governorate's ethnic composition, demonstrated by a census conducted in December 1941, Romanian government hoped to annex it eventually as a "compensation" for Northern Transylvania lost to Hungary.

These territories were lost again when the tide of the war turned. After the war, Romania regained the Transylvanian territories lost to Hungary, but not territory lost to Bulgaria or the Soviet Union. In 1948 a treaty between the Soviet Union and Soviet-occupied Communist Romania also provided for the transfer of four uninhabited islands to the Soviet Union, three in the Danube Delta and Snake Island in the Black Sea.

After World War II

After the war, the concept was interpreted as "obsolete" because of the Romanian defeat. However, even the Communist politicians between 1944 and 1947 plainly supported the re-establishment of Greater Romania. Gheorghe Apostol's reminiscence strengthens the view for the nationalist argument of the Communists at the negotiations with Stalin about the future of Northern Transylvania. In contrast with this view, Romsics quotes Valter Roman, one of the heads of the Romanian Communist Party, as writing in his memo of April 1944: "the two parts of Transylvania should be reunited as an independent state."The Romanian Communist politicians' behavior were depicted as nationalist, and this circumstance brought about the concept of National Communism, which amalgamated elements of Stalinism and Fascism. According to Trond Gilberg the regime needed the strongly nationalist attitude because of the social, economic and political challenges. After the retreat of the Soviet troops from Romania in 1958, the national ideology was reborn, however it raises questions about its reconcilability with internationalist communism. Nicolae Ceaușescu fancied the idea that the creation of Greater Romania was the fruit of the end of the nation-formation process.

Recent developments

The fall of the communist regimes in Eastern Europe and the Soviet Union and the economic downturn accompanying it led to a resurgence of nationalism in the region. Romania and Moldova, state comprising the bulk of Bessarabia which had become independent after the dissolution of the Soviet Union, confronted with their eastern neighbor, Ukraine. Bucharest and Chișinău announced territorial claims on Ukrainian lands (on parts of Chernivtsi and Odessa regions). Bulgaria surmised that the concept of Greater Romania stood behind Romanian foreign policy toward Moldova therefore expressed concerns about possible developments on Dobruja.

In 1992, the issue on unification of Moldova and Romania was negotiated between Romanian and Moldovan governments and they wanted to achieve it by the end of the year. However, the "unionists" lost their dominance in Moldova in the middle of the year. Bucharest admitted the existence of the two Romanian states (Romania and Moldova) and defined priorities in reference to this matter: "the creation of a common cultural space; the creation of an economically integrated zone; and gradual political integration". The Moldovan Snegur government became more pragmatic and realized that the nationalist propaganda from Bucharest did not help their aims especially on the problem of "Soviet annexed Bessarabia". The Romanian organizations ignored the result of the Moldovan referendum on independence because the referendum did not ask Romanians in Romania. Romanian politicians blamed Russia and the Moldovan regime that unification became unreal. According to Edward Ozhiganov (Head of the Division for Ethnopolitical Research at the Analytical Center of the Federation Council in Russia), the armed conflict in Moldova was due to the Romanian ethnic nationalism, in other words, "the attempt to create a unitary, ethnic state with power concentrated in the hands of ethnic nationalists in what was actually a multiethnic society." Furthermore, Bucharest's behavior toward Ukraine did not change until 1997 when Romanian politicians realized that resolving border disputes were a precondition for NATO membership.

Present-day Romanian irredentists (such as members of PRM) aim to take possession of territories of northern Bukovina and Bessarabia.  These regions currently belong to Ukraine and Moldova. The Russian presence and the tense political situation in Moldova also inflame their demands.  Nevertheless, radicals make territorial demands on Hungary too. The Greater Romania Party (Partidul România Mare – PRM) is an emblematic representative of the aforesaid concept, though the conception is fostered also by other right-wing groups (e.g. the organisation of the New Right –Noua Dreaptă).Uwe Backes, Patrick Moreau, The Extreme Right in Europe: Current Trends and Perspectives, Vandenhoeck & Ruprecht, 2011, p. 276 Today, the phrase "Bessarabia, Romanian land" (with several variations) is commonly used in Romania, and it poses territorial claims over the region of Bessarabia. It is also used in Moldova.

See also

List of Romanians who were born outside present-day Romania
Moldovenism
Greater Moldova
Romanianization
Little Entente
Greater Serbia
Hungarian irredentism
Greater Bulgaria
Greater Ukraine
Unification of Moldova and Romania

References

Further reading
Bucur, Maria. Eugenics and Modernization in Interwar Romania, Pittsburg: University of Pittsburgh Press, 2010
 Hoisington Jr,  William A. "The Struggle for Economic Influence in Southeastern Europe: The French Failure in Romania, 1940." Journal of Modern History 43.3 (1971): 468-482. online
 Luetkens, Gerhart. "Roumania To-Day," International Affairs  (Sep. – Oct., 1938), 17#5 pp. 682–695 in JSTOR
 
 Suveica, Svetlana, Bessarabia in the First Interwar Decade (1918–1928): Modernization by Means of Reforms, Chișinau: Pontos, 2010, 360 p. (Romanian).
 Thomas, Martin. "To arm an ally: French arms sales to Romania, 1926–1940." Journal of Strategic Studies'' 19.2 (1996): 231-259.

 
Great Union (Romania)
Romania
Romanian irredentism
Romanian nationalism
Romania–Soviet Union relations
Politics of Romania
1920s in Romania
1930s in Romania
Territorial evolution of Romania